The following ships of the Indian Navy have been named INS Pralaya:

 is a  currently in active service with the Indian Navy

Indian Navy ship names